The 2013 Varsity Shield was contested from 28 January to 1 April 2013. The tournament (also known as the FNB Varsity Shield presented by Steinhoff International for sponsorship reasons) was the third season of the Varsity Shield, an annual second-tier inter-university rugby union competition featuring five South African universities.

No team was promoted to the top-tier Varsity Cup competition for 2014.

Competition rules and information

There were five participating universities in the 2013 Varsity Shield. These teams played each other twice over the course of the season, once at home and once away.

Teams received four points for a win and two points for a draw. Bonus points were awarded to teams that scored four or more tries in a game, as well as to teams that lost a match by seven points or less. Teams were ranked by log points, then points difference (points scored less points conceded).

The top two teams qualified for the title play-offs. The team that finished first had home advantage against the team that finished second.

There was no promotion/relegation between the Varsity Cup and the Varsity Shield at the end of 2013.

The 2013 Varsity Shield used a different scoring system than the common scoring system. Tries were worth five points as usual, but conversions were worth three points instead of two, while penalties and drop goals were only worth two points instead of three.

Teams

The following teams took part in the 2013 Varsity Shield competition:

Standings

The final league standings for the 2013 Varsity Shield were:

Fixtures

The 2013 Varsity Shield fixtures were as follows:

 All times are South African (GMT+2).

Round one

Round two

Round three

Round four

Round five

Round six

Round seven

Round eight

Round nine

Round ten

Final

Players

Squad lists

The teams released the following squad lists:

Honours

See also

 Varsity Rugby
 2013 Varsity Rugby
 2013 Varsity Cup
 2013 SARU Community Cup
 2013 Vodacom Cup

References

External links
 
 

2013
2013 in South African rugby union
2013 rugby union tournaments for clubs